A Spoonful of Jazz is an album by saxophonist Bud Shank recorded in 1967 for the World Pacific label. The album features interpretations of tunes associated with The Lovin' Spoonful.

Reception

The AllMusic review by Ken Dryden awarded the album 1 star and said that: "This historical curiosity shows how desperate labels like World Pacific sought to attract some of the pop audience to jazz artists; it can be safely bypassed by all jazz fans, except for the most obsessive collectors of the music of Bud Shank".

Track listing
All compositions by John Sebasitian, except as indicated
 "Summer in the City" (John Sebastian, Mark Sebastian, Steve Boone) - 2:58
 "Did You Ever Have to Make Up Your Mind?" - 2:21
 "(You and Me and) Rain on the Roof" - 2:25
 "Amy's Theme" - 3:36
 "Cocoanut Grove" (Sebastian, Zal Yanovsky) - 2:43
 "Lovin' You" - 2:27
 "Darlin' Be Home Soon" - 3:34
 "Six O'Clock" - 2:30
 "Younger Girl" - 2:41
 "Didn't Wanna Have to Do It" - 3:08
 "Daydream" - 3:12
 'Do You Believe in Magic" - 2:06

Personnel 
Bud Shank - alto saxophone, flute 
Unidentified orchestra arranged and conducted by Shorty Rogers

References 

1967 albums
Bud Shank albums
Albums arranged by Shorty Rogers
Albums conducted by Shorty Rogers
World Pacific Records albums